Funcrusher Plus is the debut studio album by American hip hop group Company Flow. It was released by  Rawkus Records in 1997. In 2009, it was re-released on Definitive Jux. The album has been recognized as "a landmark independent hip-hop release".

Critical reception

AllMusic gave the album a perfect 5 star rating, and writer Steve Huey stated: "[Funcrusher Plus] demands intense concentration, but also rewards it, and its advancement of hip-hop as an art form is still being felt. It's difficult, challenging music, to be sure, and it's equally far ahead of its time." Jon Dolan of City Pages noted "[Company Flow's] evincing a confrontational critique of 'those signed, big-budget muthafuckas' like none hip hop has attempted since EPMD's Strictly Business."

Andrew Hultkrans of Spin gave the album 8 stars out of 10, commenting that "[the album] deconstructed hip-hop conventions and rebuilt them into a spare, murky, sputtering soundscape." Jeff Weiss of Los Angeles Times felt that "El-P conjured an apocalyptic minimalism -- the sublimated sound of clanging and cluttered train cars, city grime buried beneath cuticles, and the ghostly smoke of burning blunts."

Nate Patrin of Pitchfork said: "With the exception of the nocturnal crystalline funk of the Bigg Jus-produced 'Lune TNS' and the frequent scratch contributions from secret weapon DJ Mr. Len, Funcrusher Plus beats bear the mark of El-P's dusty-but-digital aesthetic, which even back then had the same sort of beautiful-dystopia Blade Runner feel that informed Cannibal Ox's The Cold Vein and his own Fantastic Damage a few years later."

Brian Coleman of CMJ New Music Monthly called it "the most important release of 1997 thus far." Joseph Schafer of Stereogum said, "Funcrusher Plus made for a hell of an opening salvo, and most emcee/producers would envy having such a record in their discography, but El mostly improved upon his work here later."

On October 4, 2011, "Lune TNS" was chosen by NJ.com as the Song of the Day.

In 2003, Funcrusher Plus ranked at number 84 on Pitchforks Top 100 Albums of the 1990s list. In 2014, Complex listed the album at number 86 on the 90 Best Rap Albums of the 90s. In 2015, it was chosen by Fact as number 4 on the 100 Best Indie Hip-Hop Records of All Time.

Track listing

Notes
 "Population Control" features uncredited vocals from R.A. the Rugged Man

Personnel
El-P – producer, lead vocals, mixing
Bigg Jus – producer, lead vocals
Mr. Len – producer, scratching
R.A. the Rugged Man – vocals
J-Treds – vocals
BMS – vocals
Breezly Brewin – vocals
Vassos – recording, engineering, mixing
Jeff Cordero – recording, engineering, mixing
Walker Bernard – recording, engineering
Chris Athens – mastering

Singles chart positions

References

External links
 

1997 debut albums
Company Flow albums
Rawkus Records albums
Albums produced by El-P